Mahayoddha Rama is a 2016 Indian Hindi-language animated film directed by Rohit Vaid. The film won the National Film Award for Best Animated Film. Mahayoddha Rama narrates the story of  Ramayana from Ravan's perspective. The film had a delayed release in 2016.

Cast 

Gulshan Grover, Gaurav Gera, Kiku Sharda, Roshan Abbas, Sadashiv Amrapurkar and Ameen Sayani all voice Ravan.

Production 
The film was made in 2008. Sameera Reddy was initially considered to play Sita.

Soundtrack
Music by Aadesh Shrivastava. Lyrics by Javed Akhtar.

Reception 
Arnab Banerjee of Deccan Chronicle gave the film a negative review and wrote that "What is also unbearable, at times, is the earsplitting background score: so loud it sounds that as a reflex action, you wish you could close your eyes to diminish the assault". Kunal Guha of Mumbai Mirror said that "For those who’ve watched the televised version in the '80s on Doordarshan, this would hardly be nostalgic. If anything, it will ruin your childhood memories forever." Reza Noorani of The Times of India said that "The movie is purely for kids, because it doesn’t offer much in the way of narrating Ramayana differently to grown-ups. Considering it was made eight years ago, the animation is good. However, in 2016, it leaves you wanting for more". Shubhra Gupta of The Indian Express said that "The animation of this movie is eye-catching but it is drowned by sheer noise".

References